Niccolò Gattilusio (died 1462) was the sixth and last Gattilusio lord of Lesbos (1458–1462). He was a younger son of Dorino I Gattilusio and Orietta Doria.

He deposed his elder brother Domenico Gattilusio, threw him in prison, and had him strangled. The Ottoman Sultan Mehmed II used this crime as his pretext to invade Lesbos. According to Franz Babinger, Mehmed's true motivation was that Niccolò had sheltered Catalan pirates in return for a considerable share of their loot; these pirates were preying on the nearby Anatolian coast, kidnapping their inhabitants and selling them as slaves.

In 1462, Mehmed marched from Constantinople at the head of a detachment of Janissaries across Anatolia to Assos (near the modern Behram Kõy), where on 1 September he was met by a fleet containing the balance of his forces, after which he crossed over to Lesbos. First his troops laid waste to the countryside, hoping this would intimidate Niccolò into surrendering; but Niccolò trusted to the fortifications of his city of Mytilini and its garrison of 5,000, and announced he would go down fighting. Sultan Mehmed proceeded to conquer Mytilini: after four days of skirmishing, Mehmed ordered the city bombarded with the six giant cannons he brought with him. The damage these cannons caused could not be repaired, and when the Janissaries penetrated the city, Niccolò was forced to admit his defeat. He surrendered Mytilini and the rest of the island.

Niccolò was carried off to Constantinople as a captive, along with most of his family. There he converted to Islam and was briefly released. His sister Maria Gattilusio (widow of Alexander, the brother of Emperor David of Trebizond), who was told to be lovely, entered the imperial harem. Her son Alexios became a page and as some sources relate, a favorite of sultan, but seems to have been beheaded not long afterwards.

Then Mehmed II discovered that a favorite page of his, who had fled from him some time before, had become Christian and was included among the retinue of Niccolò. This final indignity seems to have hastened Niccolò's death sentence. He was strangled to death with a bowstring in Constantinople.

References

External links

1462 deaths
Lords of Lesbos
Converts to Islam
People executed by ligature strangulation
Italian nobility
15th-century executions by the Ottoman Empire
House of Gattilusio
Year of birth unknown
15th-century rulers in Europe
15th-century Genoese people